Colfax is an  unincorporated community in Pleasant Township, Fairfield County, Ohio, United States. It lies at the intersection of U. S. Route 22 and Lake Road, approximately 39.740N latitude and -82.502W Longitude. Located in the east of the county, it lies east of Lancaster (the county seat of Fairfield County) and west of Rushville

References

Unincorporated communities in Fairfield County, Ohio
Unincorporated communities in Ohio